Aleksa Pejić (born 9 July 1999) is a Serbian football defensive midfielder, who plays for Rapid Wien.

References

External links
 
 
 

1999 births
Living people
Association football midfielders
Serbian footballers
Serbian expatriate footballers
Expatriate footballers in Belarus
Expatriate footballers in Austria
FK Proleter Novi Sad players
FK Brodarac players
FC Shakhtyor Soligorsk players
SK Rapid Wien players
Serbian SuperLiga players
Belarusian Premier League players
Austrian Football Bundesliga players
Serbia international footballers